Cleveland Township is a township in Davis County, Iowa, USA.  As of the 2000 census, its population was 675.

Note that there have been several places named Cleveland elsewhere in Iowa.  There was a Cleveland post office in Allamakee County from 1856 to 1863, and another just outside Lucas from 1877 to 1891 and 1899 to 1908.

Geography
Cleveland Township covers an area of 40.27 square miles (104.29 square kilometers); of this, 0.24 square miles (0.62 square kilometers) or 0.59 percent is water.

Cities and towns
Cleveland Township surrounds, but does not include, the county seat of Bloomfield.

Unincorporated towns
 Steuben
(This list is based on USGS data and may include former settlements.)

Adjacent townships
 Lick Creek Township (northeast)
 Perry Township (northeast)
 Prairie Township (east)
 Union Township (east)
 Grove Township (southeast)
 Wyacondah Township (southwest)
 Fox River Township (west)
 West Grove Township (west)
 Bloomfield Township (northwest)
 Drakesville Township (northwest)
 Soap Creek Township (northwest)

Cemeteries
The township contains four cemeteries: Bloomfield South, Cammack, Lester and Pollard.

Major highways
 U.S. Route 63

References
 U.S. Board on Geographic Names (GNIS)
 United States Census Bureau cartographic boundary files

Notes

External links
 US-Counties.com
 City-Data.com

Townships in Davis County, Iowa
Townships in Iowa